Stackebrandtia soli is a bacterium from the genus of Stackebrandtia which has been isolated from soil from Korea.

References 

Actinomycetia
Bacteria described in 2018